, there are more than 110 current and former places of worship in the borough of Waverley in Surrey, England. Various Christian denominations own and use 89 churches, chapels and halls across the borough, and a further 26 buildings no longer serve a religious function but survive in alternative uses.  Waverley is the largest of 11 local government districts in the county of Surrey—a small inland county south of London.  The borough is largely rural: there are some small towns and dozens of villages and hamlets.  Many of these have ancient parish churches, and other places of worship were established in the 18th, 19th and 20th centuries.

The United Kingdom Census 2011 reported that the majority of residents are Christian.  The largest number of churches in Waverley belong to the Church of England—the country's Established Church—but Roman Catholicism and Protestant Nonconformism are also well represented, the latter particularly in the ancient towns of Farnham and Godalming.  Congregationalist churches can be traced back to the 17th century in the borough, Unitarianism and the Religious Society of Friends (Quakers) have a long history in Godalming, and Methodists and Baptists each have several congregations.  Other denominations and groups represented in the borough include Christian Scientists, Jehovah's Witnesses, the Assemblies of God and the Plymouth Brethren Christian Church.

Historic England has awarded listed status to 38 current and seven former places of worship in Waverley borough.  A building is defined as "listed" when it is placed on a statutory register of buildings of "special architectural or historic interest" in accordance with the Planning (Listed Buildings and Conservation Areas) Act 1990. The Department for Culture, Media and Sport, a Government department, is responsible for this; Historic England, a non-departmental public body, acts as an agency of the department to administer the process and advise the department on relevant issues. There are three grades of listing status. Grade I, the highest, is defined as being of "exceptional interest"; Grade II* is used for "particularly important buildings of more than special interest"; and Grade II, the lowest, is used for buildings of "special interest". As of February 2001, there were 21 Grade I-listed buildings, 92 with Grade II* status and 1,548 Grade II-listed buildings in the borough.

Overview of the borough and its places of worship

Waverley is a largely rural district situated in the southwest of the county of Surrey. Its estimated population in 2013 was 122,400, a slight increase on the figure of 121,572 recorded in the United Kingdom Census 2011. At  it is the county's largest district, but the majority of the land is given over to agriculture or woodland and there are only four major settlements: the ancient towns of Farnham (population 39,765), Godalming (21,983) and Haslemere (17,010), and the village of Cranleigh which has expanded rapidly in the postwar era and had a population of 11,492 on census day in 2011. The borough has borders with the Surrey boroughs of Guildford and Mole Valley, Horsham District and Chichester District in West Sussex, and the Hampshire local authorities of East Hampshire, Hart and Rushmoor.  The majority of the land area is part of the Metropolitan Green Belt and/or the Surrey Hills Area of Outstanding Natural Beauty, while the four main towns together take up less than 10% of the land area.

There were Roman fortifications around Hascombe and Farnham, but the early history of this part of Surrey is obscure until the Saxon period, when several churches were built.  Thursley and Witley's parish churches retain some fabric from that era, and 21st-century excavations at St Andrew's Church, Farnham showed that it was built on the site of a Saxon church. Architecturally there was a major change after the Norman conquest of England, but none of Surrey's complete Norman-style churches are in Waverley and the most extensive surviving fabric from that time can be found at Witley and Ewhurst. At the latter, a lot of 12th-century work remains, but the building partly collapsed in the 19th century and had to be reconstructed. Otherwise, only the fonts at Alfold and Thursley, and some wall paintings at Witley, demonstrate how this area of Surrey's churches would have appeared during the Norman era.

Gothic architecture, specifically the Early English style, became established in Surrey in the 13th century and is discernible in many of Waverley Borough's churches. Godalming's windows and "large, impressive lead spire" are of this era, and churches such as Bramley, Chiddingfold, Elstead and Frensham retain varying amounts of 13th-century fabric; but Dunsfold is one of only two complete 13th-century churches in the whole of Surrey—the other is at Byfleet, not far from Waverley's borders in the Borough of Woking. Likewise, only Cranleigh shows what a 14th-century-style Surrey church looked like—by which time the more elaborate Decorated Gothic style had evolved from the Early English style of the previous century.

The next period of significant church-building came in the 19th century, by which time many of the centuries-old churches in the towns and villages had fallen into disrepair. The Victorian era was characterised by the restoration of such churches, often by nationally prominent architects such as William Butterfield (Cranleigh), Benjamin Ferrey (Farnham St Andrew, Thursley) and Henry Woodyer (Bramley, Chiddingfold). Also, many new Anglican churches were built in the late 19th century as large parishes were carved up and villages gained a church for the first time.  Again, major architects of the era were often involved.  Woodyer, who lived at Grafham, designed the church there in 1861–64, Hascombe (1864) and St James, Farnham (1876); George Gilbert Scott worked on Farncombe (built in stages from 1847) and Busbridge (1865–67); Ewan Christian designed Tilford (1867) and Churt (1868), and Grayswood (1900–02) was by his pupil Axel Haig; Benjamin Ferrey was responsible for St John the Evangelist Church, Hale, Surrey (1844), C.H. Howell designed Shamley Green (1864); A.R.Barker designed St Mark the Evangelist Church, Upper Hale, Farnham (1883) and the unusual Mediterranean-influenced church at Blackheath Village (1893–95) was by C.H. Townsend.

Protestant Nonconformism had several strongholds in Surrey, particularly in the west: Farnham has had numerous Nonconformist congregations since the 17th century, and Godalming was "a hotbed of radical Protestant Nonconformity". Some denominations were more successful than others: Surrey was part of the so-called "Methodist Wilderness", where "implacable opposition" to Wesley's mission was experienced until the early 20th century—especially in rural areas—and therefore few Methodist chapels became established.  In contrast, the founding of the (initially interdenominational) Surrey Mission in 1797 gave great impetus to Congregational, Baptist and Independent groups throughout the 19th century, leaving a legacy of dozens of chapels, schools and associated institutions.  Many congregations formed themselves into churches which have survived into the 21st century.  Congregationalism was especially prominent: Godalming Congregational Church looked after "out-stations" (mission chapels) in Bowlhead Green, Elstead, Eashing, Wormley and Milford; Guildford's church was responsible for founding or maintaining the chapels at Compton, Shamley Green and Blackheath Village; and the church at Farnham administered mission chapels at Lower Bourne and Wrecclesham.  General Baptist congregations developed in the late 19th century at Chiddingfold and Dunsfold, both with the help of local resident Samuel Barrow , and one was founded in Godalming around the same time. In the late 20th century, two former Congregational chapels—at Ewhurst and Milford—were taken over by Baptist groups, and a large Baptist church was built in Farnham in 1975. Strict Baptists had congregations at Cranleigh, Hale and Farnham; the first two subsequently adopted a General Baptist character, and Park Lane Chapel at Farnham (which was founded by an émigré Polish Jew who converted to Christianity) is no longer in religious use. A Strict Baptist chapel was founded in 1862 in Haslemere and remained in use until 2017.  Methodism was most successful in the far southwest of the county.  The Methodist Statistical Returns published in 1947 recorded the existence of chapels with Wesleyan Methodist origins at Cranleigh, Farnham, Godalming, Grayshott, Hale, Hascombe, Haslemere, Hindhead and Rowledge and a single ex-Primitive Methodist chapel at Badshot Lea.  Only the late 19th-century churches at Farnham, Hale and Rowledge and those at Godalming (1903) and Cranleigh (1904) are still in use.  Haslemere's original chapel was sold to another congregation in 1972 when a larger new church opened.  The former Badshot Lea Primitive Methodist Chapel survives in secular use.  The chapels at Farnham and Godalming are now home to joint Methodist and United Reformed congregations.

In contrast to Nonconformist denominations, Roman Catholicism was late to develop a presence in the area now covered by Waverley borough.  At the end of the 19th century Captain W.H. Rushbrooke of Bowlhead Green, "a very faithful supporter ... and a great benefactor [of] the Catholic Church", helped to found and pay for St Edmund King and Martyr's Church at Godalming and the predecessor of St Joan of Arc's Church at Farnham. Until that time local Catholics travelled to Sutton Place near Woking or (from 1860) to Guildford. Catholic churches at Haslemere and Bramley were originally within Godalming's vast parish, and Milford's church is still within it.  The Hindhead area was served by a private chapel from the 1930s until St Anselm's Church was built in the 1950s. The eastern part of the borough was served by the friary church at Chilworth from 1945 until the Franciscan friars took the decision to withdraw in 2010.

Although "at least two-thirds of Surrey's old churches are faced with flint", stone was much more commonly used in the southwestern parts of Surrey which are now covered by Waverley district. A geological division runs right through Waverley from west to east, entering the county at Hale and continuing along the line of the Hog's Back towards and beyond Guildford.  The sandy London Basin to the north yielded almost no usable stone, but to the south the Lower Greensand of the Early Cretaceous period offered much stone for medieval builders to work with. Bargate stone—a coarse, light-brown sandstone—was historically quarried around Chilworth, Guildford and Godalming, and was still being used for new buildings until the late 19th century and beyond. Churches built with it in the medieval period include Alfold, Bramley, Chiddingfold and Dunsfold; and among the 19th- and early-20th-century churches which used it are Busbridge, Grayswood and Hambledon, St Edmund's Catholic Church in Godalming and the Congregational chapels at Elstead (now United Reformed) and Milford (now Baptist). Chalk was quarried extensively in the east and north of Surrey, and some churches use it internally—an example is Alfold.  "Irregular veins" of carrstone also occur locally in the Lower Greensand, particularly between Tilford and Albury (near Chilworth). It was used alongside Bargate stone at Cranleigh and Tilford churches among others.  Wooden towers and bell-cots are a characteristic feature of Surrey's old churches, but in this part of Surrey only Dunsfold has one—although Hambledon's 19th-century church, designed in keeping with the Surrey vernacular, was given one. Medieval timber porches are more common, occurring at churches including Alfold, Elstead and Thursley. Nonconformist chapels, from the early-18th-century Godalming Friends Meeting House to buildings of the late 19th century, are overwhelmingly brick-built (with stone being used in later chapels), but Hale Methodist Church (1880) is mostly of flint.

Religious affiliation
According to the United Kingdom Census 2011, 121,572 people lived in the borough of Waverley.  Of these, 65.2% identified themselves as Christian, 0.6% were Muslim, 0.3% were Hindu, 0.4% were Buddhist, 0.2% were Jewish, 0.1% were Sikh, 0.4% followed another religion, 25.3% claimed no religious affiliation and 7.6% did not state their religion.  The proportion of Christians was significantly higher than the 59.8% recorded in England as a whole, and the proportion of Waverley residents not stating their religion was also slightly higher than the national figure of 7.4%.  Hinduism, Islam, Sikhism and other religions all had lower proportions of adherents than England as a whole; the proportion of people with no religious affiliation was also lower (the national figure was 27.7%); and the proportion of Jews was in line with the national figure.

Administration

Anglican churches
The Diocese of Guildford administers all of the borough's Anglican churches.  Its seat is Guildford Cathedral. The churches are grouped geographically into deaneries.  These lie within one of two Archdeaconries—Dorking Archdeaconry and Surrey Archdeaconry—which are an intermediate administrative level between the diocese and the deaneries.  All of Waverley's churches are part of the Surrey Archdeaconry and are in one of three deaneries: Cranleigh, Farnham or Godalming. Cranleigh Deanery covers the churches in Alfold, Blackheath Village, Bramley, Cranleigh, Dunsfold, Ewhurst, Grafham, Hascombe, Shamley Green and Wonersh. The churches at Busbridge, Chiddingfold, Elstead, Farncombe, Godalming, Grayswood, Hambledon, Haslemere (St Bartholomew's and St Christopher's), Milford, Ockford Ridge, Peper Harow, Shottermill, Thursley and Witley are part of Godalming Deanery. Farnham Deanery is responsible for the churches at Badshot Lea, Churt, Dockenfield, Frensham, Hale, Heath End, Hindhead, Tilford and Wrecclesham, and for all the churches in Farnham town: those at Byworth, Compton, Lower Bourne and Middle Bourne, and St Andrew's Church in the town centre.

Roman Catholic churches
All Roman Catholic churches in Waverley are administered by Guildford Deanery, one of 13 deaneries in the Roman Catholic Diocese of Arundel and Brighton, whose cathedral is at Arundel in West Sussex. The churches are at Farnham; Heath End; Haslemere, Hindhead (Beacon Hill) and Chiddingfold (part of a joint parish); Bramley and Cranleigh (also in a joint parish); and Godalming and Milford, whose joint parish also includes the Anglican church at Farncombe at which a weekly Catholic Mass is held. In addition, St Augustine's Abbey, Chilworth  www.chilworthbenedictines.com, just outside Guildford is an order of Roman Catholic monks following the Order of St Benedict (Subiaco Cassinese Congregation). Whilst not a parish, the Abbey is open to the public 365 days a year for daily Masses and Divine Office plus study days, courses and monastic vocations.

Other denominations

The six-church Guildford Methodist Circuit administers Cranleigh Methodist Church and Godalming United Church, a shared Methodist and United Reformed church. Farnham, Hale and Rowledge's Methodist churches are in the Hants–Surrey Border Circuit. Haslemere Methodist Church is within the East Solent and Downs Methodist Circuit. Godalming United Church is also within the Wessex Synod of the United Reformed Church's 13-synod national structure, as are the United Reformed churches at Beacon Hill, Elstead and Wonersh.

The Baptist churches at Chiddingfold, Dunsfold, Ewhurst, Farnham, Godalming and Milford are part of the Guildford Network of the South Eastern Baptist Association. Bethel Baptist Chapel in Hale maintains links with GraceNet UK, an association of Reformed Evangelical Christian churches and organisations.

Alfold Chapel, Binscombe Church and the Emmanuel Free Church in Farnham are members of two Evangelical groups: the Fellowship of Independent Evangelical Churches (FIEC), a pastoral and administrative network of about 500 churches with an evangelical outlook, and Affinity (formerly the British Evangelical Council), a network of conservative Evangelical congregations throughout Great Britain.

Listed status

Current places of worship

Former places of worship

Former places of worship demolished since 2000

Notes

References

Bibliography

 
 
 

 
 
 
 
 
 (Available online in 14 parts; Guide to abbreviations on page 6)
 
 
 
 
 
 
 
 
 
 

Waverley (borough)
Waverley
Waverley (borough)
Churches
Waverley,places of worship